Shariatpur-2 is a constituency represented in the Jatiya Sangsad (National Parliament) of Bangladesh since 2019 by AKM Enamul Haque Shamim of the Awami League.

Boundaries 
The constituency encompasses Naria Upazila and the Sakhipur Thana portion of Bhedarganj Upazila. Sakhipur Thana consists of Arshi Nagar, Char Bhaga, Char Kumaria, Char Census, Dhakhin Tarabunia, Digar Mahishkhali, Kachikata, Sakhipur, and Tarabunia union parishads.

History 
The constituency was created in 1984 from the Faridpur-15 constituency when the former Faridpur District was split into five districts: Rajbari, Faridpur, Gopalganj, Madaripur, and Shariatpur.

Ahead of the 2008 general election, the Election Commission redrew constituency boundaries to reflect population changes revealed by the 2001 Bangladesh census. The 2008 redistricting altered the boundaries of the constituency.

Members of Parliament

Elections

Elections in the 2010s 
Shawkat Ali was re-elected unopposed in the 2014 general election after opposition parties withdrew their candidacies in a boycott of the election.

Elections in the 2000s

Elections in the 1990s

References

External links
 

Parliamentary constituencies in Bangladesh
Shariatpur District